Jisün (Mongolian term), also known as zhisunfu or Zhisun (also written as  or ), zhixun, jixun, zhama or Jisun, was a very important male Mongol garment during the Yuan dynasty. They were also known as Mongol "robes of honour" (khil'at). The zhisun was a form of ceremonial clothing, which was worn during the jisün banquets (also known as zhama banquets), which were the most important ceremony of the Yuan dynasty court . The zhisun were made of textile woven with gold and silk of one colour. In China, the zhisun was introduced during the Yuan dynasty and was inherited by the Han Chinese during the Ming dynasty. In both the Yuan and Ming dynasty, the zhisun is a single-coloured court robe. The zhisun is a type of Mongol terlig.

Terminology 
The term zhama came from the Persian word jāmah which is translated as "garment" or "robe" or "coat" or "clothing".

The term jisün means "colour" in Mongolian. The term zhisun originates from the Mongolian term jisün. In the History of the Yuan dynasty, the zhisun are defined as "a dress of the same colour" or "being of one colour" or "robe of one colour" or "dress in one colour".

The term zhixun was used in the Ming dynasty and originated from the term zhisun.

History

Origins 
The zhisun likely originated in early period of the Mongol rule; it was first introduced under the rule of Genghis Khan, but it became more elaborate after the foundation of the Yuan dynasty by Kublai Khan.

Yuan dynasty 
In the Yuan dynasty, the zhisun was worn by the Yuan Emperors and officials. The zhisun was a ceremonial court dress which was bestowed by the Emperors to the higher-ranking officials, imperial relatives, those who had made great contributions and those who serve the emperors . It could only be worn when bestowed by the emperor as such it held an important place for every official's political life in the Yuan dynasty; and if it was bestowed by the Emperor, the zhisun had to be worn.

In 1321 AD, during the rule of Emperor Yingzong, the zhisunfu dressing code was officially formulated. This dress code also combined the clothing characteristics of both the Han Chinese and the Mongol ethnicity.

In 1332 AD, an imperial edict stated that all officials and imperial guards who had been bestowed with zhisun were required to wear it during the imperial banquets, and those would pawn off their zhisun would be punished. Distinguished higher-ranking imperial officials, in particular, wore it when they would meet with the Emperors or when they would attend banquets. The zhisun worn by the Han Chinese who would participate in the banquets organized by the Yuan imperial court were also bestowed by the Yuan Emperors. The participants of the jisun banquets had to be dressed in the same colour.

The zhisun could also be worn by lower-ranking singers, musicians, and security guards. However, it appears that there were two kind of zhisun during the banquets: the first type which was worn as a formal dress for the Yuan Emperors, his officials and the nobilities, and the second type which was worn by the servants.

Ming dynasty 
In the Ming dynasty, the Zhisun was mainly worn as a regular clothing by military officials, such as the court guards and guards of honour, who are referred as xiaowei. In 1373 AD, the clothing of the imperial body guards was changed to the zhisun, a solid colour robe which had been inherited from the Yuan dynasty.

According to A Collection of the Code of the Great Ming, A Veritable Record of the Ming dynasty and the Writings after a dream in Shining Spring, the xiaowei all wore zhisun robe.

According to A Collection of the Code of the Great Ming, the jinyiwei who were on duties at the East and West City circuit and the other men in charged of whip throwing, fan holding, umbrella-like towel holding also wore zhisun robe. According to Understanding Elegance, the red or green robes which were made out of silk and which were worn by the jinyiwei was called zhixun; the zhixun was decorated with ground flowers.

Design and Construction 
The zhisun is described as being of a single colour. The zhisun worn by the Yuan emperor and higher-ranking officials during court banquets typically had the same colour, design and form, with the workmanship and exquisiteness of ornaments as the difference. All the zhisun worn by Han Chinese during court banquets all the same form and design. However, the zhisun was not made to have a fixed design or form. According to the History of the Yuan dynasty, the zhisun is described as not having a fixed design or form, and the summer design is different from the winter design. These robes were also different in design depending on the social classes of its wearer, but they were all referred as zhisun. For example, the emperor had 11 varieties of zhisun for the winter season and 15 varieties for summer while members of the nobility and the senior officials had 9 varieties of zhisun during winter and 14 in summer.

The zhisun could also be made from variety of fabrics, including nasīj (or nasji), silk, and wool. They were also embellished with precious stones and pearls.

In the Great statutes of statecraft《經世大典 - Jingshi dadian》by Yu Ji (1272–1348) recorded that the "[...] Zhisun is the robe worn by high officials when they attend an imperial banquet. Nowadays it takes the form of a bright red robe with string of large pearls sewn on the back and shoulders [...]".

Derivatives and influences

China 
The yesa robe, which was a new form garment in the Ming dynasty, has some of its mixed-elements either developed from the Mongol terlig, or from the zhisun robe, which is itself a form of terlig.

Similar garments 

 Feiyufu
 Terlig
 Yesa

See also 
Fashion in Yuan dynasty
List of Hanfu
Hanfu
Robe of honour - an ancient tradition of bestowing clothing
Khalat - a loose, long-sleeved outer silk or cotton robe common in Central Asia and South Asia

References 

 
 
Dynasties in Chinese history
History of Asian clothing
Chinese traditional clothing
Mongolian fashion
Mongolian culture